Skinny (They Can't Get Enough) is the third and final studio album by rap group The Skinny Boys. It was released in 1988 for Jive Records, distributed by RCA Records and was produced by Mark Bush. Skinny (They Can't Get Enough) peaked at #71 on the Billboard Top R&B/Hip-Hop Albums.

Track listing
"Skinny (They Can't Get Enough)" – 3:43
"Mystery" – 4:00
"Stylin'" – 4:04
"Free Your Mind" – 4:15 (Featuring Wee Papa Girl Rappers) 
"Set The Pace (Say Yeah)" – 3:50
"Straight To The Dome" – 4:05
"Skinny Groove" – 2:08
"Get Pepped" – 4:01
"Cause We're Getting Ours" – 4:09 (Featuring Chuck Chillout) 
"Stop Crying" – 4:22 (Featuring Flavor Flav) 
"I Think It's Time" – 4:04
"On" – 4:04
"Every Kid's Dream" – 1:35

In popular culture
The title track was featured in the 1993 films True Romance and Grumpy Old Men.

1988 albums
The Skinny Boys albums